The Albanian Volleyball Cup (Women) is a competition featuring female professional volleyball clubs from Albania and the second important event after Albanian Volleyball League. It was founded in 1954 from the Albanian Federation of Volleyball. The team with the most trophies is KS Dinamo with 21 cups.

Winners
These are the winners of the Albanian Volleyball Cup.

Trophy Ranking

KS Dinamo 21 times

KV Tirana 11 times

Skënderbeu Korçë 8 times

Universiteti “Marin Barleti” Tiranë 7 times

Teuta 4 times

Partizani Tirana 4 times

Vllaznia Shkodër 3 times

Studenti Tiranë 2 times

SK Lushnja 2 times

Minatori 2 times

Flamurtari Vlorë 1 time

KS Elbasani 1 time

References

External links 

FSHV Official Website

See also
 Albanian Volleyball League (Women)
 Albanian Volleyball Supercup (Women)
 Nationwide Volleyball Supercup (Women)

 

Volleyball in Albania